Ramin Kohankhaki is an Iranian nurse, Certified first responder, humanitarian and author. He received the Florence Nightingale Medal in 2015 for her work in nursing.

Career
In 1987, Kohankhaki was accepted to the Tehran University of Medical Sciences in Tehran, Iran.
In 1991, he joined the Emergency Response Unit (IFRC).
He has worked as a nurse and Certified first responder in field projects in Iraq, Afghanistan,Indonesia, Lebanon, Libya, Yemen, Somalia and Mogadishu.
He is an active member of the IRCS in disaster situations and in areas of public health and nursing education.
He has launched BHCU and RDH in hospitals in Iraq and Lebanon.

Honours
He won the Florence Nightingale Medal 2015, which recognizes exceptional courage and devotion to victims of armed conflict or natural disaster.

References 

Tehran University of Medical Sciences alumni
Iranian nurses
Iranian humanitarians
Médecins Sans Frontières
Living people
Year of birth missing (living people)